This page lists diplomatic missions resident in Greenland, an autonomous territory within the Kingdom of Denmark, which is physiographically a part of the continent of North America.
At present, the country hosts 13 honorary consuls and two fully staffed consulates general in the capital city of Nuuk. The United States opened a consulate in 1940, following the Nazi occupation of Denmark, and closed the consulate in 1953. The United States, which, alongside the European Union and Iceland, is host to a Greenland Representative Office, officially opened a consulate general in the capital Nuuk in June 2020.

Consulates General 
Nuuk, Greenland 
 (Consulate General)
 (Consulate)

Honorary Consuls 
Nuuk, Greenland 
 (Honorary Consul)
 (Honorary Consul)
 (Honorary Consul)
 (Honorary Consul)
 (Honorary Consul)
 (Honorary Consul)
 (Honorary Consul)
 (Honorary Consul)
 (Honorary Consul)
 (Honorary Consul)
 (Honorary Consul)
 (Honorary Consul)
 (Honorary Consul)
Tasiilaq, Greenland
 (Honorary Consul)
Qaqortoq, Greenland
 (Honorary Consul)

Former Consulates
Godthåb, Greenland
 (1940-1953)

See also 
 Proposals for the United States to purchase Greenland
 Greenland Representation to the European Union
 High Commission of Denmark in Greenland
 List of diplomatic missions in Denmark
 Foreign relations of Greenland

References 

Diplomatic missions in Greenland